Robert Lucas (July 25, 1962 – November 23, 2008) was an American blues musician, singer, guitarist and harmonica player, who became the front man for the group Canned Heat in the mid 1990s and was also a solo artist.

Background

Personal life
Lucas came from a middle-class family, and grew up in Long Beach, California. He took up harmonica at the age of 13. At around 16 he started playing slide-guitar. While at school in the 1970s, he wasn't into the pop music of the day. He preferred the older blues records.

Career
Lucas joined Bernie Pearl's band as a harmonica player after taking lessons from him. Some of the artists that he backed up as a harmonica player included Big Joe Turner, George "Harmonica" Smith, Pee Wee Crayton, Lowell Fulson, Eddie "Cleanhead" Vinson, and Percy Mayfield. In 1986, he formed the band Luke & The Locomotives. In 1992, he played shows in the UK in support of his AudioQuest album Built For Comfort. His backing musicians were: Rick Lacey (drums), Ian Edmundson (bass), and Gary Burnett (guitar). In 1993, he was one of the many acts scheduled to play at the Orange County Blues Festival. In 1994, he joined Canned Heat and fronted the band. He played on their 1999 album Boogie 2000. In 2000, he left for a solo career, but by 2005, he had rejoined the band.

Death
Lucas died from what appeared to be a drug overdose at a friends place in Long Beach, California. He was 46 years of age.

Discography

With Luke And The Locomotives
 Luke And The Locomotives - Audioquest Music AQ-LP1004 (1991)

As solo artist
 Usin' Man Blues - AudioQuest Music AQ-LP1001 (1990)
 Built For Comfort - AudioQuest Music AQ-LP1011 (1992)
 Layaway - AudioQuest Music AQ-LP1021 (1994)
 Completely Blue - AudioQuest Music AQ-CD1045 (1997)

References

American blues singers
American blues guitarists
American male guitarists
1962 births
2008 deaths
20th-century American guitarists
20th-century American singers
20th-century American male musicians